The Commandos de Chasse were a French Counterinsurgency Commando force raised for the Algerian war.

French Air Force General Maurice Challe ordered the forming of Commandos de Chasse (Hunting Commandos) in December 1958 and by 1959 there were around 25 commando units in each Army Corps area in Algeria. Around 150 would be eventually formed with most containing around 140 men but with some commando legers (light commandos) having only 70 men. Enlisted membership consisted of 30 to 60 percent Moslem volunteers, mostly harkis, "turned" ALN fighters, and veterans of regular French army units. The commandos contained a higher proportion of French personnel than other French colonial units.

The Commandos task was to track and follow ALN units until they were engaged by French army intervention units.

The Commandos were designated by either a K (for Kimono) or P (for Partisan) prefix followed by a number.

Commandos wore the standard French Army green or camouflaged uniforms, often mixed, with Bigeard caps or camouflaged berets. They did not wear bush hats or helmets. They often disguised themselves in partial or full native clothing.

They were equipped with standard French army small arms and light machine guns. Mainly of 9 mm MAT 49 submachineguns, 7.5 mm MAS 36 bolt-action rifles, MAS 49 semi-automatic rifles and MAS 49/56  grenade launcher rifles, some AA52 light machine guns, which supplanted and then replaced the FM 24-29 light machineguns, as well as offensive and defensive hand grenades.

See also
 Counterinsurgency
 Commandos (Portugal)

References

Algerian War
Army units and formations of France
Special forces of France